Pontibacter mucosus  is a halotolerant, Gram-negative and rod-shaped bacterium from the genus of Pontibacter which has been isolated from hexachlorocyclohexane-contaminated pond sediments from Chinhat in Lucknow in India.

References

External links
Type strain of Pontibacter mucosus at BacDive -  the Bacterial Diversity Metadatabase

Cytophagia
Bacteria described in 2016